Journey into the Depth of the Student's Soul  is a Czechoslovak comedy film directed by Martin Frič. It was released in 1939.

Cast
 Jindřich Plachta - Matulka - Natural science teacher
 Jaroslav Marvan - Vobořil - Mathematics Teacher
 František Vnouček - Voříšek - Czech Language Teacher
 Miloš Nedbal - Šeda - French Teacher
 Jaroslav Průcha - Rabiška - Physics teacher
 František Kreuzmann - Tuřík 
 Ludvík Veverka - Prof. Kahuda
 Vojta Novák - Dr. Vondrák
 Jarmila Holmová - Rázová - Geography Teacher
 Karel Veverka - Schoolmaster
 Ferenc Futurista - Janitor Petule
 Ladislav Pešek - Kulík
 R. A. Strejka - Peterka (as A. R. Strejka)
 Rudolf Hrušínský - Vanĕk
 František Filipovský - Mazánek

References

External links
 

1939 films
1939 comedy films
1930s Czech-language films
Czechoslovak black-and-white films
Films directed by Martin Frič
Czechoslovak comedy films
1930s Czech films